Buffalo High School may refer to:

Buffalo High School (Buffalo, Iowa)
Buffalo High School (Buffalo, Minnesota) 
Buffalo High School (Buffalo, Missouri)
Buffalo High School (West Virginia)
Buffalo High School (Buffalo, Wyoming)